Crassispira mackintoshi is a species of sea snail, a marine gastropod mollusk in the family Pseudomelatomidae.

References

 Fallon P.J. (2011) Descriptions and illustrations of some new and poorly known turrids (Gastropoda: Turridae) of the tropical northwestern Atlantic. Part 3. Genus Crassispira Swainson, 1840, subgenus Crassiclava McLean, 1971. The Nautilus 125(2): 53-62.

mackintoshi
Gastropods described in 2011